The 6th FINA World Open Water Swimming Championships was being held July 15–23, 2010 in Lac Saint-Jean near Roberval, Quebec, Canada.

The championships featured 3 race distances: 5-kilometre (5K), 10-kilometre (10K) and 25-kilometre (25K). Schedule for the championships was:
Saturday, July 17: Women's 10K (11:30 a.m.)
Sunday, July 18: Men's 10K (11:30 a.m.)
Tuesday, July 20: Women's 5K (10:30 a.m.), Men's 5K (2:00 p.m.)
Thursday, July 22: Women's 25K (9:15 a.m. start), Men's 25K (9:00 a.m. start)

The 2010 edition of the Open Water Worlds were the last stand-alone "open" (meaning no age limit) championships, and a Junior Open Water Worlds is to be created in its place. However, the Open Water events will remain in the biennial World Championships. This change brings the open water discipline closer to matching FINA's other disciplines in championships structuring.

Participating countries
On 14 June 2010, the event organizers announced that 144 athletes from 30 countries have entered the championships. Countries entered are:

 (4)
 (7)
 (3)
 (3)
  (5)
 (1)
 (7)
 (3)
 (4)
 (5)
 (3)
 (8)
 (5)
 (4)
 (3)
 (1)
 (8)
 (5)
 (1)
 (1)
 (1)
 (10)
 (2)
 (1)
 (2)
 (5)
*
 (3)
*
 (8)

*Syria and the UAE are both listed in the overview of teams attending; however, neither have entries on the athlete roster for the Championships.

Results

Overall standings

Medals

Points
Overall point standings for the 6th Open Water Worlds are:

See also
2008 FINA World Open Water Swimming Championships

References

FINA World Open Water Swimming Championships
Fina World Open Water Swimming Championships, 2010
Fina World Open Water Swimming Championships, 2010
Roberval, Quebec
International aquatics competitions hosted by Canada
Swimming competitions in Canada